Alastair Iain Johnston is the Gov. James Albert Noe and Linda Noe Laine Professor of China in World Affairs in the Government Department of Harvard University. His work focuses on contemporary Chinese foreign policy and international relations.  He has a BA in International Relations and History from the University of Toronto (1981), an MA in East Asian Studies from Harvard University (1985), and a PhD in Political Science from the University of Michigan (1993), where his advisors were Robert Axelrod, Albert Feuerwerker, Kenneth Lieberthal, and Michel Oksenberg.

Books 
 Cultural Realism: Strategic Culture and Grand Strategy in Chinese History (Princeton 1995) 
 Social States: China in International Institutions, 1980-2000 (Princeton University Press, 2008)
 Engaging China: The Management of an Emerging Power (Routledge 1999), edited with Robert S. Ross 
 New Directions in the Study of China’s Foreign Policy (Stanford 2006), edited with Robert S. Ross
 Crafting Cooperation: Regional Institutions in Comparative Perspective (Cambridge 2007), edited with Amitav Acharya 
 Perception and Misperception in American and Chinese Views of the Other (Carnegie Endowment for International Peace 2015), edited with Shen Mingming

References 

Harvard University faculty
Living people
Year of birth missing (living people)
University of Toronto alumni
Harvard University alumni
University of Michigan alumni